Chinese salvationist religions or Chinese folk religious sects are a Chinese religious tradition characterised by a concern for salvation (moral fulfillment) of the person and the society. They are distinguished by egalitarianism, a founding charismatic person often informed by a divine revelation, a specific theology written in holy texts, a millenarian eschatology and a voluntary path of salvation, an embodied experience of the numinous through healing and self-cultivation, and an expansive orientation through evangelism and philanthropy.

Some scholars consider these religions a single phenomenon, and others consider them the fourth great Chinese religious category alongside the well-established Confucianism, Buddhism and Taoism. Generally these religions focus on the worship of the universal God (Shangdi), represented as either male, female, or genderless, and regard their holy patriarchs as embodiments of God.

Terminology and definition

"Chinese salvationist religions" ( jiùdù zōngjiào) is a contemporary neologism coined as a sociological category and gives prominence to folk religious sects' central pursuit that is the salvation of the individual and the society, in other words the moral fulfillment of individuals in reconstructed communities of sense. Chinese scholars traditionally describe them as "folk religious sects" ( mínjiān zōngjiào,  mínjiān jiàomén or  mínjiān jiàopài) or "folk beliefs" ( mínjiān xìnyǎng).

They are distinct from the common indigenous religion of the Han Chinese consisting in the worship of gods and ancestors, although in English language there is a terminological confusion between the two. The 20th-century expression of these folk religious movements has been studied under the definition of "redemptive societies" ( jiùshì tuántǐ), coined by scholar Prasenjit Duara.

A collective name that has been in use possibly since the latter part of the Qing dynasty is huìdàomén ( "churches, ways and gates"), as their names interchangeably use the terms huì ( "church", "society", "association", "congregation"; when referring to their corporate form), dào ( "way") or mén ( "gate[way]", "door").

Their congregations and points of worship are usually called táng ( "church", "hall") or tán ( "altar"). Western scholars often mistakenly identify them as "Protestant" churches.

The Vietnamese religions of Minh Đạo and Caodaism emerged from the same tradition of Chinese folk religious movements.

Secret religions
A category overlapping with that of the movements of salvation is that of the "secret societies" ( mìmì shèhuì, or  mìmì jiéshè), religious communities of initiatory and secretive character, including rural militias and fraternal organisations which became very popular in the early republican period, and often labeled as "heretical doctrines" ( zōngjiào yìduān).

Recent scholarship has begun to use the label "secret sects" ( mìmì jiàomén) to distinguish the peasant "secret societies" with a positive dimension of the Yuan, Ming and Qing periods, from the negatively viewed "secret societies" of the early republic that became instruments of anti-revolutionary forces (the Guomindang or Japan).

Origin and history

Many of these religions are traced to the White Lotus tradition ("Chinese Maternism", as mentioned by Philip Clart) that was already active in the Song dynasty; others claim a Taoist legacy and are based on the recovery of ancient scriptures attributed to important immortals such as Lü Dongbin and Zhang Sanfeng, and have contributed to the popularisation of neidan; other ones are distinctively Confucian and advocate the realisation of a "great commonwealth" (datong ) on a world scale, as dreamt of in the Book of Rites. Some scholars even find influences from Manichaeism, Mohism and shamanic traditions.

In the Ming and Qing dynasties many folk religious movements were outlawed by the imperial authorities as "evil religions" ( xiéjiào). With the collapse of the Qing state in 1911 the sects enjoyed an unprecedented period of freedom and thrived, and many of them were officially recognised as religious groups by the early republican government.

The founding of the People's Republic in 1949 saw them suppressed once again, although since the 1990s and 2000s the climate was relaxed and some of them have received some form of official recognition. In Taiwan all the still existing restrictions were rescinded in the 1980s.

Folk religious movements began to rapidly revive in mainland China in the 1980s, and now if conceptualised as a single group they are said to have the same number of followers of the five state-sanctioned religions of China taken together. Scholars and government officials have been discussing to systematise and unify this large base of religious organisations; in 2004 the State Administration of Religious Affairs created a department for the management of folk religions. In the late 2015 a step was made at least for those of them with a Confucian identity, with the foundation of the Holy Confucian Church of China which aims to unite in a single body all Confucian religious groups.

Many of the movements of salvation of the 20th and 21st century aspire to become the repository of the entirety of the Chinese tradition in the face of Western modernism and materialism, advocating an "Eastern solution to the problems of the modern world", or even interacting with the modern discourse of an Asian-centered universal civilisation.

Geography and diffusion

The Chinese folk religious movements of salvation are mostly concentrated in northern and northeastern China, although with a significant influence reaching the Yangtze River Delta since the 16th century. The northern provinces have been a fertile ground for the movements of salvation for a number of reasons: ① firstly, popular religious movements were active in the region already in the Han dynasty, and they deeply penetrated local society; ② secondly, northern provinces are characterised by social mobility around the capital and weak traditional social structure, thus folk religious movements of salvation fulfill the demand of individual searching for new forms of community and social network.

According to the Chinese General Social Survey of 2012, approximately 2.2% of the population of China, which is around 30 million people, claim to be members of folk religious sects. The actual number of followers may be higher, about the same as the number of members of the five state-sanctioned religions of China if counted together. In Taiwan, recognised folk religious movements of salvation gather approximately 10% of the population as of the mid-2000s.

Chronological record of major sects

Earliest influences (Yuan, 1277–1377)
 White Lotus ( Báiliánjiào)
 Maitreya teachings ( Mílèjiào)

Ming (1367–1644) and Qing (1644–1911)
 Baguadao ( "Way of the Eight Trigrams") networks
 Denghua ( "Flower of Light") sect
 Hongyang ( "Great Sun") or Hunyuan ( "Original Undetermined") sect
 Huangtiandao ( "Way of the Yellow Sky") or Xuangu ( "Dark Drum") sect
 Luo teaching ( Luójiào, "Luo (Menghong)'s tradition"): Patriarch Luo was reportedly polemical towards the Bailian, Maitreyan, and Huangtian sects
 Dacheng ( "Great Vehicle") or Yuandun ( "Sudden Stillness") sect, the eastern branch of Luoism
 Sects requiring fasting ( zhāijiāo), including Xiantiandao dubbed the Qinglian ( "Black [Blue, or Green] Lotus") sect during the Qing
 Mohou Yizhu ( "Final Salvation") sect founded by Wang Jueyi in the 1870s, renamed Yiguandao in 1905
 Dacheng teaching of Mount Jizu ( Jīzúshān dàchéngjiào), a western branch of Luoism founded by Zhang Baotai in Yunnan
 Church of the Highest Supreme ( Tàishànghuì)
 Church of the Heaven and the Earth ( Tiāndìhuì) or Tiandimen ( "Gate of the Heaven and the Earth")
 Sanyi teaching ( "Three-One"), founded by Li Zhao'en on the base of Confucian principles

Republic of China (1912–49)
 Zaili teaching ( Zàilǐjiào, "Abiding Principle")—registered in 1913
 Daode Xueshe ( "Community for the Study of the Way and its Virtue")—1916
 Xiantiandao ( "Way of the Former Heaven") networks
 Shengdao ( "Holy Way"), best known by its incorporate name of Tongshanshe ( "Community of the Goodness")—1917
 Guiyidao ("Way of the Return to the One"), best known by its corporate name of School of the Way of the Return to the One or simply School of the Way ( Dàoyuàn)—1921-27
 Yiguandao ( "Consistent Way")—registered in 1947
 Haizidao ( "Way of the Children")—branched out in the 1980s
 Miledadao ( "Great Way of Maitreya")—branched out in the 1980s
 Dragon Flower Church of the Heart-bound Heavenly Way ( Yīxīn Tiāndào Lónghuá Huì)—1932
 Yuanmingdao ( "Way of the Bright Circle")
 Yaochidao ( "Way of the Jasper Lake")
 Guigendao ( "Way of the Return to the Root")
 Jiushi ( "Life Healing") sect, also known by its corporate name Wushanshe ( "Community of the Awakening to the Goodness")—1919
 Universal Church of the Way and its Virtue ( Wànguó Dàodéhuì)—1921
 Jiugongdao ("Way of the Nine Palaces")—1926
 Holy Church of the Heavenly Virtue ( Tiāndé shèngjiào)—early form of Tiandiism, recognised in 1930
 Church of Virtue ( Déjiàohuì)—started in 1945
 Zhenkongdao ( "Way of the True Emptiness")—1948
 Confucian Church ( Kǒngjiàohuì)—founded by Kang Youwei
 Xixinshe ( "Community of the Pure Heart")—another organisation of Kang Youwei's idea of a Confucian church
 Yellow Sand Society—rural secret society and millenarian sect

Late 20th century
 Xuanyuandao ( "Way of the Mysterious Origin")—founded in 1952
 Confucian Way of the Gods ( Rúzōng Shénjiào)—started in 1853, formally established in 1979
 Lord of Universe Church ( Tiāndìjiào)—branch of Tiandiism established in 1979
 Qigong ( "Cultivation of the Spirit")
 Falungong ( "Cultivation of the Wheel of Law")
 Zishen Nation — led by the self-proclaimed emperor Li Guangchang, the sect ruled a small area in Zhejiang from 1981 to 1986

21st century

 Confucian religious groups in China mainland (Confucian churches)
 Weixinism ( Wéixīnjiào, "Only Heart") or "Holy Church of the Heart-Only" ( Wéixīn Shèngjiào)

Other sects
 Changshandao
 Church of Maitreya the King of the Universe ( Yǔzhòu mílè huáng jiào)
 Dadao Hui ( "Church of the Big Sword")
 Datong Hui ( "Church of the Great Harmony")
 Dayiism ( Dàyì jiào, "Great Simplicity")
 Dongyue Hui
 Gengshen Hui
 Guixiangdao ( "Way of the Kneeling to Incense")
 Holy Church of the Middle Flower ( Zhōnghuá shèngjiào)
 Hongsanism ( Hóngsān jiào, "Red Three")
 Huangjidao ( "Way of the Imperial Pole")
 Huangxiandao ( "Way of the Yellow Immortal")
 Huazhaidao ( "Way of Flowers and Fasting")
 Jiugendao ( "Way of the Old Source")
 Laojundao ( "Way of the Venerable Master")
 Laorendao ( "Way of the Venerable Men")
 Mount Li Maternism ( Líshān Lǎomǔ jiào)
 Puhuamen ( "Gate of the Universal Change")
 Pujidao ( "Way of the Universal Help")
 Puduism ( Pǔdù jiào, "Universal Judgement"), Pududao ( "Way of the Universal Judgment")
 Qixingism
 Qiugongdao
 Renxuehaodao ( "Way of Men Learning the Goodness")
 Sanfengdao ( "Way of the Three Peaks")
 Shengxiandao ( "Way of the Sages and the Immortals")
 Shenmendao ( "Way of the Godly Gate")
 Sifangdao ( "Way of the Four Manifestations")
 Suibiandao
 Tianguangdao ( "Way of the Heavenly Light")
 Tianhuadao ( "Way of the Heavenly Flower")
 Tianmingdao ( "Way of the Heavenly Bright")
 Tianxianmiaodao ( "Way of the Temple of the Heavenly Immortals")
 Wanquandao ( "Way of the Endless Whole" or "Surefire Way")
 Wugong Hui
 Xiaodao Hui ( "Church of the Small Sword")
 Xuanmen Zhenzong ("True School of the Mysterious Gate")
 Yinjiezhi Hui
 Yuanshuai Hui
 Yuxumen ( "Gate of the Jade Vacuity")
 Zhongfangdao ( "Way of the Middle Abode")
 Zhongjiao Daoyi Hui
 Zhongyongdao ( "Way of the Golden Mean")
 Zhongxiao Tianfu ( "Heavenly House of Filial Loyalty")
 Zhutian Hui
 Zishenguo ("Zishen nation")

See also
 Ancestor veneration in China
 Chinese Buddhism
 Chinese folk religion
 Chinese folk religion in Southeast Asia
 Chinese Manichaeism
 Chinese religions of fasting
 Confucianism—Confucian church
 Japanese new religions, some of which are related to Chinese sects
 Maitreya teachings
 Northeast China folk religion
 Taoism—Taoist schools
 White Lotus
 In Vietnam
 Caodaism
 Minh Đạo
 In Indonesia
 Confucian Religion in Indonesia
 In Philippines
 Bell Church

References

Citations

Sources 

 
 
 
 List first published in: 
 
 
 Ownby, David (2016). “Redemptive Societies in the Twentieth Century.” In Modern Chinese Religion II 1850–2015, edited by Vincent Goossaert, Jan Kiely and John Lagerwey, Leiden: Brill, vol. 2, 685–727.
 
 
 
 
 
 
 
 

 
Chinese secret societies
Chinese folk religion
Religion in China
Religion in Taiwan
East Asian religions